Bavanat County is in Fars province, Iran. The capital of the county is the city of Surian. At the 2006 census, the county's population was 44,069 in 11,341 households. The following census in 2011 counted 48,416 people in 13,636 households. At the 2016 census, the county's population was 50,418 in 15,874 households. Sarchehan District was separated from Bavanat County in 2018 to become Sarchehan County.

Administrative divisions

The population history and structural changes of Bavanat County's administrative divisions over three consecutive censuses are shown in the following table. The latest census shows three districts, seven rural districts, and four cities.

References

 

Counties of Fars Province